Yong He Yuan is a complex of two residential towers designed by Florent Nédélec and located in Taipei, Taiwan.

Design
The Yong He Yuan Residences has a unique design that incorporates a woven pattern throughout the facades of the towers. The pattern is made of a series of light stripped grey granites and dark aluminum panels. The facades incorporate large square windows in between the interlaced horizontal and vertical elements of the pattern and are generously recessed to provide additional shading and protection from the sun. The luxury amenities include, gym, landscape terraces, swimming pool, under-ground parking garage, and retails.

Gallery

External links
 Florent Nédélec Architecture Official site
 China Times, May 2012, 置產避險挑地段品牌首選雍河院
 Perspective Magazine, June 2012, A Quiet presence
 Hinge Magazine, May 2012, Yong He Yuan Residences
 Home Journal, April 2012, Wowen Wonder

See also
 Florent Nédélec
 The Jervois

2012 establishments in Taiwan
Residential buildings in Taiwan